Battersea Park is a suburban railway station in the London Borough of Wandsworth, south London.

It is close to Battersea Park, and not far from Battersea Power Station. It is also a short walking distance from Queenstown Road (Battersea) station.

The station now has an out of station interchange (OSI) with the new Battersea Power Station tube station on the newly opened Northern line extension to Battersea, part of the London Underground.

Description
The station has a polychrome brick Venetian Gothic facade. It is a Grade 2 listed building designed by Charles Henry Driver.

Access to the five platforms is via steep wooden staircases. Most services at the station call at Platforms 3 and 4, on the slow lines into Victoria. Platform 1 (the former down South London line platform) is made completely from wood and ceased to be used from December 2012. Platform 1 has had its tracks removed. Platform 2 (the former up South London line platform) is used by the limited London Overground services that serve the station; it is now a terminal platform since the adjacent Platform 3 was extended over the former junction between the South London and main lines in 2014. Platform 5, on the down fast line from Victoria, is rarely used, usually during engineering works or congestion problems in London Victoria with services passing towards Clapham Junction. London Overground has a daily service to Dalston Junction.

The station is within short walking distance of Battersea Power Station Underground station, an extension of the Northern line to Battersea Power Station which opened in September 2021. The two stations serves as an out of station interchange.

History

The first station to carry the name "Battersea Park" was opened by the London, Brighton and South Coast Railway (LB&SCR) as "Battersea" on 1 October 1860 and was located at the southern end of what is now Grosvenor Bridge. It was named "Battersea Park" on 1 July 1862 but was sometimes called "Battersea Park and Steamboat Pier". It closed on 1 November 1870 concurrently with the opening of Grosvenor Road station situated at the north end of Grosvenor Bridge.
The LB&SCR opened a high-level line between Pouparts Junction and Battersea Pier Junction on 1 May 1867 as a means of reducing congestion at Stewarts Lane. York Road (Battersea) station opened at this time.
The station was renamed Battersea Park and York Road 1 January 1877 and Battersea Park on 1 June 1885.

The South London line through the station to London Bridge was electrified on 1 December 1909 'Elevated Electric' overhead system. and to Crystal Palace on 12 May 1911, on the LB&SCR 'Elevated Electric' overhead system.

At the end of August 2009, electronic ticket gates were installed. There was some staffing provision but the station has been fully staffed from first to last train as part of the Southern franchise from September 2009.

With the redevelopment of Battersea Power Station into "The Power Station London", the station is due a complete refurbishment.

Services

Services are operated by Southern and London Overground using  and  EMUs.  is around the corner, within easy walking distance and provides access to South Western Railway services, though transfer at Clapham Junction is more common.

The typical off peak service in trains per hour is:
 6 tph to 
 2 tph to  via 
 2 tph to  via 
 2 tph to  via 

Until December 2012, Southern operated a twice-hourly service from London Victoria to London Bridge via Denmark Hill. This ceased when London Overground's Clapham Junction to Dalston Junction service commenced at that time.

Since December 2012, a skeleton London Overground service has run to and from Battersea Park (instead of Clapham Junction) at the extreme ends of the day to retain a "parliamentary service" between Battersea Park and Wandsworth Road. The station is also used by London Overground when the route into Clapham Junction is closed by engineering work.

On Saturdays, there are services to Dalston Junction at 07:30, 07:45, 08:00, 08:15 and 08:33, and from Dalston Junction at 07:15, 07:33, 07:48 and 08:03.

Owing to the very limited London Overground service, Battersea Park does not appear on the standard Tube and Overground maps, although it does appear on some line diagrams inside Overground trains.

Accidents

1881 crash
On 24 December 1881, a train hauled by LBSC Terrier No.70 Poplar collided with the rear of the 11:35pm from London Bridge owing to a fogman's error.

1937 crash

On 2 April 1937, two electric passenger trains collided just south of the station; ten people were killed and 17 seriously injured. The signalman at Battersea Park, believing there to be a fault with his equipment, overrode the electrical interlocking and allowed the second train into the occupied section.

1985 crash
On 31 May 1985, 1D91 09:20 Gatwick Airport to Victoria Gatwick express formed of  GLV,  8301, 8203, 8313,  73117 collided with 2L51 08:51 East Grinstead to Victoria formed of DEMU  1113 and  1309 travelling along the up fast main line from Clapham Junction. Train 2L51 was then stopped for 1–2 minutes at signal VC552 displaying a red aspect. When that signal cleared, 2L51 was accelerating past it when it was struck from behind by 1D91 which had passed the protecting signal, VC564, at Danger.

There was no derailment but the shock of collision passing down each train caused damage throughout the length of both. Only one vehicle sustained severe structural damage; this was the leading passenger coach of 1D91, running immediately behind the GLV. One window each side was broken when this deformation occurred through the window opening, but the general integrity of the vehicles could be judged by the fact that these were the only external windows broken throughout the two trains.

The trains were conveying a large number of passengers, one estimate being as high as 800. In the collision 104 persons suffered injury and were taken to two hospitals by means of ten ambulances, the first of which arrived at 09:58. Most of the injured suffered only cuts and bruises and were discharged after treatment, but eighteen had serious injuries requiring detention in hospital for periods between one and fourteen nights. Twenty other passengers later reported having suffered injury. The uninjured passengers were conveyed forward to Victoria at 10:58 by a special train, the unobstructed Slow lines having been re-energised for electric trains at 10:45 after an initial complete isolation of the conductor rails in the area. During the day the damaged trains were made fit to move and hauled into sidings so that, there being no damage to the track or signalling equipment, normal working was resumed at 16:12.

Motive power depots
The West End of London and Crystal Palace Railway opened an engine shed off what is now Prince of Wales Drive on 29 March 1858. It closed in 1877.

The London Brighton and South Coast Railway built a roundhouse a few yards north of the station on the lower level in 1869, extended with a second adjoining roundhouse in 1870 and a third in 1889. It closed 15 July 1934, but remained in use as a road transport depot until demolished in 1986.

Connections
London Buses routes 44, 137, 156, 344, 436, 452 and night routes N44 and N137 serve the station.

References

External links 

Railway stations in the London Borough of Wandsworth
Former London, Brighton and South Coast Railway stations
Railway stations in Great Britain opened in 1867
Railway stations served by Govia Thameslink Railway
Railway stations served by London Overground
Buildings and structures in Battersea
1867 establishments in England
Charles Henry Driver railway stations
Grade II listed buildings in the London Borough of Wandsworth
Grade II listed railway stations